"Cho Ka Ka O" or "Chaud cacao" ("Hot cocoa") is a song performed by Belgian singer Annie Cordy. The song was written by Vivien Vallay, Patrick Bousquet and Pierre Carrel. The song was released in France and Belgium in 1985. The song sold more than two and a half million singles worldwide In 2021, the song was criticized for being racist, a claim one of the writers, Vallay, denied.

Gummibär version

Composition 
the song is Sung in G major and then transposes to G# major, and it is a spin-off of Annie Cordy's version except it has cartoon music rather than tropical music

Background 
In 2007, German virtual singer Gummibär covered "Cho Ka Ka O (Choco Choco Choco)" for his debut album I Am Your Gummy Bear. This version peaked at number 16 on the French chart.

Music video
"Cho Ka Ka O" was released on March 23, 2008 on YouTube and features Gummibär dreaming of being immersed in a tropical island virtual video game reality. He then gets into a series of mishaps such as being run over and hit by coconuts, getting covered in hot chocolate, and being chased by crabs. He is also shown doing the hula dance. As of December 2022, the song has 278 million views.

Charts

Annie Cordy version

Gummibär version

Covers
 In 2013, the controversial humorist Dieudonné M'bala M'bala made a cover of the song by turning the words : this new version, entitled "Shoananas" (in reference to The Holocaust), earned the comedian a sentence to a €28.000 fine for defamation, libel and incitement to hatred and racial discrimination.
 In 2015, Chico & the Gypsies made a cover of the song during the show "This is Your Life Annie Cordy".
 In 2017, Lartiste song Chocolat lyrics Cho Cho Cho Chocolat, has been featured in the song.

References

1985 songs
1985 singles
Annie Cordy songs
Gummibär songs
2008 singles